The Discovery Islands are a group of islands located at the northern end of the Salish Sea and the eastern end of Johnstone Strait, between Vancouver Island and the mainland coast of British Columbia, Canada.

Most of these islands have very few residents. Only Quadra Island and Cortes Island have ferry service. The remainder are served by private boat or float plane.

Geography
The complex geography of the area can make it difficult to determine when travelling by boat if a sighted coastline belongs to the mainland, Vancouver Island, or one of the Discovery Islands.

Major islands

The Discovery Islands are all located within the Strathcona Regional District, except for a few of the southernmost, such as Hernando Island and Savary Island, which are in the Powell River Regional District. The larger islands within the Discovery Islands are:

Strathcona Regional District
Cortes Island (west: Subtle Islands)
Hardwicke Island (north: Poyntz, Seymour, Murray; west: Yorke; south: Helmcken)
 West Thurlow Island
 East Thurlow Island (west: Walkem Islands; south: Tum)
 Sonora Island (northwest: Hardinge, Block)
 Stuart Island
 Quadra Island (north: Okis Islands)
 Maurelle Island
 Mitlenatch Island
 Read Island (east: Hill Island, Penn Islands)
 Rendezvous Islands
 Raza Island
 West Redonda Island (south: Mink, Kinghorn, and the Martin Islands; north: Elizabeth)
 East Redonda Island (south: Melville, Morgan, Eveleigh, Otter, and the William Islands; north: Double, Channel)
 Marina Island
 Twin Islands

Powell River Regional District
 Hernando Island (east: Copeland Islands)
 Mink Island
 Savary Island

Major waterways
The Discovery Passage starts where the Strait of Georgia narrows between Quadra Island and Vancouver Island and continues north to Chatham Point, where it meets the Nodales Channel and Johnstone Strait.

Tourism
The primary attraction for visitors are salmon fishing, sailing, kayaking, and hiking.

See also
Gulf Islands
Queen Charlotte Strait

External links

Discovery Islands

 
South Coast of British Columbia
Central Coast of British Columbia
Archipelagoes of British Columbia
Archipelagoes of the Pacific Ocean